The year 2003 in architecture involved some significant architectural events and new buildings.

Events
 July 1 – Taipei 101 is topped out to become the tallest building in the world.
 December 20 – Triumph-Palace apartment building in Moscow becomes the highest building in Europe.
 date unknown
 Daniel Libeskind's design, entitled Memory Foundations, is accepted for the World Trade Center site in New York.
 Demolition of the Department of the Environment Building (completed 1971) at Marsham Street, Westminster, London. A new five storey glass-faced Home Office building is being erected in its place.
 Nathaniel Kahn's film, My Architect: A Son's Journey, is nominated for the 2003 Academy Award for Documentary Feature.

Buildings and structures

Buildings opened

January 26 — Friedman Wrestling Center at Cornell University opens, designed by CannonDesign. Friedman is said to be "the first arena in the nation built solely for [wrestling]."
 February 8 – New Salt Lake City Public Library (Utah), USA, designed by Moshe Safdie and VCBO Architecture.
 February 14 – L'Oceanogràfic marine park in Valencia, Spain, designed by Félix Candela, Alberto Domingo and Carlos Lázaro.
 March 30 – Leonard P. Zakim Bunker Hill Memorial Bridge across the Charles River in Boston, Massachusetts, USA, a cable-stayed bridge designed by Christian Menn, Theodore Zoli (from HNTB), W. Denney Pate (from FIGG) and Ruchu Hsu with Parsons Brinckerhoff, is opened northbound (southbound December 20).
 May – Fashion and Textile Museum in the London borough of Bermondsey, a warehouse conversion by Ricardo Legorreta.
 May 10 – Christchurch Art Gallery in New Zealand, designed by the Buchan Group.
 July 8 – Oscar Niemeyer Museum (Novo Museu) reopens in Curitiba, Brazil, originally designed by Oscar Niemeyer.
 September 4 – Selfridges store in Birmingham, England, designed by Czech-born British architect Jan Kaplický of Future Systems.
 September – Maggie's Centre, Dundee, Scotland, a drop-in cancer care centre; Frank Gehry's first work in the United Kingdom.
 October 23 – Walt Disney Concert Hall, designed by Frank Gehry, in Los Angeles, California, USA.
 December 30 – Estádio Municipal de Braga, Portugal, designed by Eduardo Souto de Moura.

Buildings completed

 Auditorio de Tenerife in Santa Cruz de Tenerife, Canary Islands, Spain, designed by Santiago Calatrava
 Centre for Mathematical Sciences (Cambridge), England, designed by Edward Cullinan Architects.
 Corrour Lodge, Inverness-shire, Scotland, designed by Moshe Safdie.
 The Doughnut (Government Communications Headquarters), near Cheltenham, England.
 Eleanor Roosevelt College, University of California, San Diego, designed by Moshe Safdie.
 Kamačnik Bridge, Gorski Kotar, Croatia, designed by Zlatko Šavor and built by Konstruktor.
 Kista Science Tower, Stockholm, Sweden.
 Schaulager, Münchenstein, Switzerland, designed by Herzog & de Meuron.
 Pantages Tower, Toronto, Ontario, Canada, designed by Moshe Safdie and Core Architects.
 Park Pobedy station in the Moscow Metro system.
 Zeughaus Wing of Deutsches Historisches Museum, designed by I. M. Pei, opens in Berlin.
 Peabody Essex Museum new wing, designed by Moshe Safdie, opens in Salem, Massachusetts.
 Latino Cultural Center in Dallas, Texas, designed by Ricardo Legorreta.
 Taipei Treasure Hill designed by Marco Casagrande.
 Keller Estate Winery in Petaluma, California, designed by Ricardo Legorreta.
 Oare Pavilion in Wiltshire, England, designed by I. M. Pei.
 Black rubber house, Dungeness beach, Kent, England, designed by Simon Conder Associates.
 Pie house in Deerfield, Illinois.
 Torre Mayor, the tallest building in Mexico (2003–present).

Awards

 Architecture Firm Award – The Miller Hull Partnership
 Alvar Aalto Medal – Rogelio Salmona
 Driehaus Prize – Léon Krier
 Emporis Skyscraper Award – 30 St Mary Axe
 European Union Prize for Contemporary Architecture (Mies van der Rohe Prize) – Zaha Hadid for Car Park and Terminus Hoenheim North
 Grand Prix de l'urbanisme – Michel Corajoud
 Mies van der Rohe Prize – Zaha Hadid
 Praemium Imperiale Architecture Laureate – Rem Koolhaas
 Pritzker Prize – Jørn Utzon
 Prix de l'Équerre d'Argent – Yves Lion and Claire Piguet, French Embassy in Beirut
 RAIA Gold Medal – Peter Corrigan
 RIAS Award for Architecture – Sutherland Hussey Architects for An Turas Ferry Shelter, Tiree
 RIBA Royal Gold Medal – Rafael Moneo
 Stirling Prize – Herzog & de Meuron, Laban dance centre
 Thomas Jefferson Medal in Architecture – Tod Williams and Billie Tsien
 Twenty-five Year Award – Design Research Headquarters Building

Deaths
 March 3 – Peter Smithson, English architect (born 1923)
 March 6 – Sam Scorer, English architect (born 1923)
 April 10 – Abraham Zabludovsky, Polish-born Mexican architect (born 1924)
 May 5 – Sir Philip Powell, English architect (born 1921)
 May 27 – Geoffrey Bawa, Sri Lankan architect (born 1919)
 August 10 – Cedric Price, English architect (born 1934)

See also
Timeline of architecture

References

 
21st-century architecture